The 1952 Maine Black Bears football team was an American football team that represented the University of Maine as a member of the Yankee Conference during the 1952 college football season. In its second season under head coach Harold Westerman, the team compiled a 4–3 record (3–1 against conference opponents) and finished in a three-way tie for the Yankee Conference championship. The team played its home games at Alumni Field in Orono, Maine. John Butterfield and Phil Butterfield, Jr., were the team captains.

Schedule

References

Maine
Maine Black Bears football seasons
Yankee Conference football champion seasons
Maine Black Bears football